ScicosLab is a software package providing a multi-platform environment for scientific computation. It is based on the official Scilab 4.x (BUILD4) distribution, and includes the modeling and simulation tool Scicos and a number of other toolboxes.

The latest stable version of ScicosLab is ScicosLab 4.4.2.

It is possible that Scilab/Scicos is currently the most complete alternative to commercial packages for dynamic systems modeling and simulation packages such as MATLAB/Simulink and MATRIXx/SystemBuild."

Features 
ScicosLab runs, and is available in binary format, for the main available platforms like Unix/Linux workstations, Microsoft Windows, and MacOSX. Scicoslab was based on Scilab and Scicos, but it was forked from them. Currently it is separated from the new versions evolution in order to maintain compatibility among them.

See also 
 Scilab
 Scicos

External links
ScicosLab Homepage
Scilab License
Scicos Homepage
Maxplus Homepage
Scicos-FLEX Homepage - Scicos-FLEX is a toolbox for code generation for embedded microcontrollers
E4Coder: The toolset based on ScicosLab for simulation and code generation for embedded devices

References 

Numerical programming languages
Cross-platform software